Gloria Elizabeth Núñez Sánchez (born 20 March 1984) is a Mexican politician affiliated with the PRI. As of 2013, she served as Deputy of the LXII Legislature of the Mexican Congress representing Nayarit.

References

1984 births
Living people
Politicians from Jalisco
Women members of the Chamber of Deputies (Mexico)
Members of the Chamber of Deputies (Mexico) for Nayarit
Institutional Revolutionary Party politicians
21st-century Mexican politicians
21st-century Mexican women politicians
Autonomous University of Nayarit alumni
Members of the Congress of Nayarit
Deputies of the LXII Legislature of Mexico
Members of the Senate of the Republic (Mexico) for Nayarit
Women members of the Senate of the Republic (Mexico)